One Cleveland Center is the fifth tallest skyscraper located in downtown Cleveland, Ohio, following Erieview Tower. It was purchased on May 15, 2008 for $86.3 million by Optima International LLC, a Miami-based real estate investment firm led by Chaim Schochet and 2/3rd owned by the Privat Group, one of Ukraine's largest business and banking groups.

Design and history
Designed by KlingStubbins, One Cleveland Center has an angular, "silver chisel" design similar to that of New York City's Citigroup Center.  The land the tower was built on was intended to be part of the I. M. Pei Erieview urban renewal plan. The site was cleared in 1963 but was not developed and was used as a parking lot. It was sold to Medical Mutual by John W. Galbreath in 1979 to develop a "people oriented" office building. Ground was broken on October 30, 1980, and construction was completed in 1983.  The tower's base is structured into a five-story glass garden atrium.  It also houses a fitness center on the top two floors of the contiguous parking structure, and a 400-seat conference center named the Cleveland Metropolitan Bar Association Conference Center.

One Cleveland Center also uses Citigroup Center-style diagonal trusses. During construction of One Cleveland Center, the trusses were added to make the One Cleveland Center more rigid and able to handle Cleveland's sometimes windy downtown conditions, especially in the winter months. One Cleveland Center also uses Citigroup Center-style skin. The Trusses can be seen at night when the building is lit up.

In 2003, CNBC reported from One Cleveland Center about an investment banker named Frank Gruttadauria. Gruttadauria worked for Lehman Brothers at their Cleveland Offices, which are based at One Cleveland Center. Gruttadauria was charged with embezzlement of investment funds from the Fazio family who at one time owned a Cleveland-area chain of grocery stores. He served some time in Federal jail until his release in 2009.

Renovations
In 2009, it was announced that the plaza and landscaping of One Cleveland Center were to be renovated. Construction began in August 2009 when crews demolished the original 1983 designed plaza. In addition to the outdoor plaza, the 1983 lobby will also be renovated with new flooring, a new canopy entrance, and amenities such as an LCD display televisions and a news ticker in the lobby. Westlake Reed and Leskosky is main architect for the renovation of the lobby. It should be completed in time for the upcoming 2016 Republican National Convention.

Tenants
 Bellwether Enterprise: Commercial Mortgage Banking
 Cleveland-Cuyahoga County Port Authority
 Cleveland Metropolitan Bar Association
 Grant Thornton LLP—Accounting Firm
 KPMG LLP—Accounting Firm
 Merrill Lynch-Investment Firm
 PNC-Bank Branch
 Sun Life Financial—Financial Services
 Whole Health Management Inc.(Walgreens Inc.)
Cleveland Research Company

See also
List of tallest buildings in Cleveland

References

External links
Images and architectural information
The CMBA Conference Center
Official Website

Office buildings completed in 1983
Skyscraper office buildings in Cleveland